Washi Tahsil is a tahsil/taluka (subdistrict) in Osmanabad district, Maharashtra on the Deccan Plateau of India. The town of Washi is the administrative headquarters of the tahsil.  There are forty-three panchayat villages in Washi Tahsil.

Demographics
In the 2001 Indian census, Washi Tahsil had a population of 95,434, with 49,346 (51.7%) males and 46,088 (48.3%) females, for a gender ratio of 934 females per thousand males.

In the 2011 census, Washi Tahsil had 92,173 inhabitants and a gender ratio of 918 females per thousand males. The tahsil was 100% rural. The literacy rate in 2011 was 75.09% overall in Washi Tahsil, with a rate of 85.26% for males and 64.22% for females. In 2011 in Washi Tahsil, 11.3% of the population was 0 to 6 years of age. There was no explanation for the decrease in population from 2001 to 2010 for the tahsil, but the village of Washi suffered even a higher percentage decrease.

References 

Osmanabad district
Talukas in Maharashtra